This is a list of the members of the Storting in the period 1950 to 1953. The list includes all those initially elected to the Storting.

There were a total of 150 representatives, distributed among the parties: 85 from the Norwegian Labour Party, 23 from the Conservative Party, 21 from the Liberal Party, 12 from the Farmer’s Party and 9 from the Christian Democratic Party.

Aust-Agder

Vest-Agder

Market towns of Vest-Agder and Rogaland
These market towns were Flekkefjord, Haugesund, Kristiansand, Mandal and Stavanger.

Akershus

Bergen

Buskerud

Market towns of Buskerud
These market towns were Drammen, Hønefoss and Kongsberg.

Finnmark

Hedmark

Market towns of Hedmark and Oppland
These market towns were Gjøvik, Hamar, Kongsvinger and Lillehammer.

Hordaland

Møre og Romsdal

Market towns of Møre og Romsdal
These market towns were Kristiansund, Molde and Ålesund.

Nordland

Market towns of Nordland, Troms and Finnmark
These market towns were Bodø, Hammerfest, Narvik, Tromsø, Vadsø and Vardø.

Oppland

Oslo

Rogaland

Sogn og Fjordane

Telemark

Market towns of Telemark and Aust-Agder
These market towns were Arendal, Brevik, Grimstad, Kragerø, Notodden, Porsgrunn, Risør and Skien.

Troms

Nord-Trøndelag

Sør-Trøndelag

Market towns of Sør-Trøndelag and Nord-Trøndelag
These market towns were Levanger and Trondheim.

Vestfold

Market towns of Vestfold
These market towns were Holmestrand, Horten, Larvik, Sandefjord, Stavern and Tønsberg.

Østfold

Market towns of Østfold and Akershus
These market towns were Drøbak, Fredrikstad, Halden, Moss and Sarpsborg.

 
Parliament of Norway, 1950–53